Charles Spence (1779-1869) was a Scottish poet, stonemason and footman.
The Bard of Gowrie; the Poet of the Carse.
Spence was born in the parish of Kinfauns, spent most of his life in Rait and died in Manchester.

Linn-ma-Gray I long to see
Thy heathy heights and broomy lea;
Whaur linnets lilt and leverets play
Around the roar of Linn-Ma-Gray.

Linn-ma-Gray when to the street
Crowds follow crowds, in crowds to meet,
I wend my solitary way,
An' climb the cliffs of Linn-ma-Gray.

Linn-ma-Gray, each mounting spring,
From age to age doth tribute bring,
And rushing onwards to the Tay,
Augment the stream of Linn-ma-Gray.

Linn-ma-Gray round Baron hill, [Up the heights of Baron Hill,]
I've aften gane wi' richt gude will, [I've led my Jean with right good will.]
An' sat and seen the dashing spray [And sat, and seen the foamy spray]
Lash the dark rocks of Linn-ma-Gray. [Lash the dark rocks of Linne Magray.]

Linn-ma-Gray, when in yon ha'
The merry wassailers gather a'
In vain their waeel trained bands essay
The minstrelsy of Linn-ma-Gray.

Another favourite Spence poem was entitled: 'My love's window'.

References

 Robert Chambers, The Threiplands of Fingask, 1880.
 Rev. James M'Turk Strachan, BD, FRSA (Scot),  From the Braes of the Carse, Charles Spence's Poems and Songs, 1898.
(Strachan was 48 years minister at Kilspindie & died in 1936).
 Lawrence Melville, The Fair Land of Gowrie, William Culross & Son, Coupar Angus, 1939 (reprinted 1975).
P. R. Drummond, FSA, [Peter Robert Drummond (1802-1879)] Perthshire in bygone days: one hundred biographical essays, W. B. Whittingham & Son, London, 1879. (Charles Spence, is described on pages 293-309)

Spence
People from Perth and Kinross
1779 births
1869 deaths